Ge Hong (b. 283 – d. 343 or 364), courtesy name Zhichuan (稚川), was a Chinese linguist, Taoist practitioner, philosopher, physician, politician, and writer during the Eastern Jin dynasty. He was the author of Essays on Chinese Characters, the Baopuzi, the Emergency Formulae at an Elbow's Length, among others. He was the originator of first aid in traditional Chinese medicine and influenced later generations.

Early life
Ge Hong was born as the third son into a well-established family, his father died when he was 13.

Career
In his public service role as an official, he was often asked to appraise his friends and acquaintances as possible candidates for government office positions and was also chosen to perform military service. However, he was unhappy with his life as an official. Although he never rejected Confucianism, he grew interested in Taoist cultivation and using drugs so he could achieve the spiritual freedoms of Taoist Immortality.

He wrote an autobiography of his life that was the last part of his collected writings

His grandfather served as Minister of Personnel and his father as governor. By Ge Hong's time, although the family was declining, he was once made Marquis (noble title) of the area within the past relying on his meritorious military service.

See also
 Bao Gu
 Ge Chaofu
 Ge Xuan

References

Further reading
Campany, Robert Ford. To Live As Long As Heaven and Earth: Ge Hong's Traditions of Divine Transcendents. Berkeley: University of California Press, 2002
Davis, Tenney and Ch’en Kuo-fu. "The Inner Chapters of Pao-p’u-tzu." Proceedings of the American Academy of Arts and Sciences 74 (1941): 297–325. chaps. 8 and 11
Fang Xuanling, et al. Jin shu (History of the Jin Dynasty). 10 vols. Beijing: Zhonghua shuju, 1998
Feifel, Eugene. "Pao-p’u tzu nei-p’ien." Monumenta Serica 6 (1941): 113–211; 9 (1944): 1–33; 11 (1946): 1–32. [chaps. 1–4 and 11]
Giles, Lionel. A Gallery of Chinese Immortals. London: John Murray, 1948.
Hausen, Johan and Tsaur, Allen. The Arts of Daoism. Auckland: Purple Cloud Press, 2021
Hu Fuchen. Baopuzi neipian yanjiu (Research on the Inner Chapters of The Master Embracing Simplicity). Beijing: Xinhua chubanshe, 1991
Obed Simon Johnson, A Study of Chinese Alchemy, Shanghai, Commercial, 1928. rpt. New York: Arno P, 1974.
Lin Lixue. Baopuzi nei wai pian sixiang xi lun (An Analysis of the Thought of the Inner and Outer Chapters of The Master Embracing Simplicity). Taipei: Xuesheng, 1980.
Penny, Benjamin. "The Text and Authorship of Shenxian zhuan". Journal of Oriental Studies 34 (1996): 165–209.
Ren Jiyu, ed. Zhongguo daojiao shi (A History of Chinese Daoism). Shanghai: Shanghai renmin chubanshe, 1997.
Robinet, Isabelle. Daoism: Growth of a Religion, translated by Phyllis Brooks. Stanford: Stanford University Press, 1997.
Sailey, Jay. The Master Who Embraces Simplicity: A study of the philosopher Ko Hung, A.D. 283-343. San Francisco: Chinese Materials Center. 1978. 
Sivin, Nathan. "On the Pao P’u Tzu Nei Pien and the Life of Ko Hong (283-343)". Isis 60 (1976): 388–391.
Sivin, Nathan. "On the Word ‘Daoist’ as a Source of Perplexity". History of Religions 17(1978): 303–330.
Tang Yijie. Wei Jin Nan Bei Chao shiqi de daojiao (Daoism in the Wei, Jin, and Northern and Southern Dynasties Era). Taipei: Dongda tushu gongsi yinhang, 1991
Wang Liqi. Ge Hong lun (A Discussion of Ge Hong). Taipei: Wunan tushu chubanshe, 1997.
Ware, James R. Alchemy, Medicine and Religion in the China of A.D. 320: The Nei Pien of Ko Hung.  Mineola, NY: Dover. 1981. 
Wells, Matthew. "Self as Historical Artifact: Ge Hong and Early Chinese Autobiography". Early Medieval China 9 (2003): 71–103.
Wong, Eva. Teachings of the Tao. Boston: Shambhala, 1997. (96–104)
Wu Lu-ch’iang and Tenney Davis. "An Ancient Chinese Alchemical Classic. Ko Hung on the Gold Medicine and on the Yellow and the White." Proceedings of the American Academy of Arts and Sciences 70 (1935): 221–84. [chaps. 4 and 16]

External links

Internet Encyclopedia of Philosophy entry
Biographical profile
Ge Hong on abstention from grains

283 births
4th-century Chinese physicians
4th-century Chinese philosophers
Chinese medical writers
Jin dynasty (266–420) philosophers
Jin dynasty (266–420) politicians
Linguists from China
Philosophers from Jiangsu
Physicians from Jiangsu
Writers from Zhenjiang